Michael Jerome Restovich (born January 3, 1979) is an American / Serbian former professional baseball first baseman and outfielder.

High school career
Restovich attended Mayo High School in Rochester, Minnesota, where after his senior season in 1997 he was named player of the year for the state of Minnesota, and also made the All-American team.

Professional career

Minnesota Twins
The Minnesota Twins selected Restovich in the second round of the 1997 MLB draft. In , he played for the Rookie-Class Elizabethton Twins.

Chicago White Sox
In January , he signed a minor league contract with the Chicago White Sox with an invitation to spring training.

Los Angeles Dodgers
On January 8, 2010, Restovich signed a minor league deal with the Los Angeles Dodgers with an invite to spring training.

References

External links
, or MiLB.com, or Retrosheet
Sportsnet
Pelota Binaria (Venezuelan Winter League)

1979 births
Living people
Albuquerque Isotopes players
American expatriate baseball players in Canada
American expatriate baseball players in Japan
Baseball players from Minnesota
Charlotte Knights players
Chicago Cubs players
Colorado Rockies players
Columbus Clippers players
Edmonton Trappers players
Elizabethton Twins players
Fort Myers Miracle players
Fort Wayne Wizards players
Fukuoka SoftBank Hawks players
Iowa Cubs players
Major League Baseball outfielders
Minnesota Twins players
Navegantes del Magallanes players
American expatriate baseball players in Venezuela
New Britain Rock Cats players
Pittsburgh Pirates players
Quad Cities River Bandits players
Reno Aces players
Rochester Red Wings players
Sportspeople from Rochester, Minnesota
Washington Nationals players